Omonia, is a Cypriot professional basketball club based in Nicosia, Cyprus. The club competes in Cyprus Basket League Division 1 for season 2022–2023. The president of the team is Marios Argirides and the Head Coach is Michael Matsentides.

History
Omonia BC was founded in 1948 from then the team participates regularly in the Cyprus Basketball Division 1. The team has never won neither a championship neither a cup. However, the team has sometimes finished first and second in the regular season of the Cyprus Basketball Division 1, it could not manage to proceed far and away from its opponents.

Regular Season League Positions

Honors
Cyprus Basketball Division B
Champions (3): 1988–89, 1993–94, 1999–00

European competitions
1995–96: Korać Cup
1996–97: Korać Cup

Roster

Former players

References

External links
 Official Website
 Official GATE 9 Fan Club website
 GATE 9 LIMASSOL – The Red Version
 Omonia Nicosia Fans
 OmonoiaG9.com Fans Site
 Omonia Fans website
 Omonia Fans Portal – KIFINES.COM
 Fans of Omonia – Videoblog
 Nissan Omonia in eurobasket.com

Basketball teams in Cyprus
Basketball teams established in 1948
AC Omonia
1948 establishments in Cyprus